Maestro Levita is a 1938  Argentine film directed by Luis César Amadori. The film premiered in Buenos Aires.

Cast

 Pepe Arias as Simón Galván
 Mecha Ortiz as Elena Acevedo de Lerena
 Juan Carlos Thorry as Roberto Casaval
 María Santos as Señorita Baigorria
 Aída Olivier as Isabel
 Miguel Gómez Bao as Dr.Ferran
 Alberto Bello as Sr. Navarro
 Delia Garcés as Felisa
 Semillita as Newsboy
 Raúl Rossi as Boy
 Bernardo Perrone as Judge
 Lalo Malcolm as Elena's friend
 Cirilo Etulain as Attorney

External links

1938 films
1930s Spanish-language films
Argentine black-and-white films
Films directed by Luis César Amadori
1930s Argentine films